Nico Beyer (born 15 June 1964) is a German film director and producer. He is noted for his unique visual style and wide array of different techniques and formats.

His commercial work has won him numerous, international awards, such as gold and silver Lions in Cannes, Clio Awards, Cresta Awards, ADC, LIA, CICLOPS, D&AD, New York Festival, Eurobest, Red Dot Awards, among many others.

Beyer is well known for his video collaborations with the Pet Shop Boys, The Verve, They Might Be Giants and Suzanne Vega, as well as for his award-winning advertising campaigns.

Early life 

Beyer was born in Wilhelmshaven, Germany. He is the son of artist Ulli Beyer and the grandson of writer Anja Lundholm. After graduating from the Kunstakademie Düsseldorf, Beyer worked with renown video artist Nam June Paik and Horst H. Baumann, documenting their work on video.

Career 

Beyers career as a filmmaker began with creating idents for MTV Europe, which gained him international recognition. He then (1991) moved from Düsseldorf to[Paris, where he signed with international production company Partizan. His videos and first TV spots for fashion designer Thierry Mugler, Diesel, Der Spiegel, Jason Donovan, Forbes Magazine ignited his international advertising career. Beyer signed with Propaganda Films in Hollywood (1993) and later Passport Films and then Compass Films and directed campaigns, such as Mercedes-Benz, Panasonic, Swatch (featuring Nina Hagen) etc... He moved from Paris to New York City. Beyer also continued his music video work and directed videos for The Shamen, U96, Swing Out Sister, Suzanne Vega, Tony! Toni! Toné!, Erasure, Cocteau Twins, Galliano and They Might Be Giants.
 
In 1996, Beyer moved from New York City to Berlin. He opened his own production company Mann Im Mond.

So far, Beyer was experimenting with digital post production. His unique style was best featured in Shots magazine.

From now on, Beyer focused on pure photography, story telling and cinematic images.

As a result, Beyer shot his first short film Phantom (1998), which premiered at the Berlinale (Berlin Film Festival).

Beyer now used advertising to tell stories and to work with actors, which was most visible in his music videos for Deine Lakaien and Eartling.

He directed TV spots for Frankfurter Allgemeine Zeitung, SWR, Audi, Renault and Coca-Cola, which won him silver and gold Lions at the renown Cannes Lions Festival, as well as Gold at the New York Film Festival, Gold at the Art Directors Club of New York.

Beyer moved back to Paris (1999), where he continued his work with his new production company Chased by Cowboys and his new business partner Edward Grann. Beyer's visual style enabled him to enter into car advertising. His campaign for Infinity (2001) and collaboration with advertising agency Chiat Day, started his career in American advertising.

He joined Chased by Cowboys in Venice, California, owned by Exec. Producer Linda Ross and directed renown campaigns, such as Mercedes's launch of the E Class and the epic Super Bowl spot for the new Ford F 150 truck (2004). Beyer further directed TV spots for Lexus, Canon, Nike, BMW, Cadillac and Land Rover.

Many awards followed : Gold at the Cannes Lions Festival, Gold at the Clio Festival etc...

Beyer also started a career in Japan. His campaign for Nissan Stagea and collaboration with advertising agency Hakohodu was extremely successful.

Beyer shared his time between Paris and Los Angeles (2003 - 2008). Directing and producing for his own company Chased by Cowboys.

In 2004, Beyer directed his first TV Show Gottschalk America, featuring celebrity host Thomas Gottschalk. In the same year, Beyer collaborated with Michael Moore on his campaign against former US president George W. Bush. Beyer directed a spot, which shows George W. Bush as the great dictator, recreating the famous dance with the globe of Charlie Chaplin masterpiece The Great Dictator. The spot won Gold at the non profit AD Spot Festival.

In 2008, Beyer moved to Lucerne in Switzerland, where he lives and works until today.

Beyer is now working on his first movie script. He also directs TV spots and music videos (he is represented by White Label in the US market and Black Label for the European market). He recently shot campaigns for Hornbach, Audi, Lexus, Jeep, Mercedes, Sky, Smart, Axe, O2 (Telefónica) and Adidas.

His campaign for Hornbach and his spot for Caritas won Beyer numerous, international awards, such as Lions in Cannes, Clio Awards, Cresta Awards, ADC, LIA, Eurobest, Spotlight, Klappe etc...

Filmography

Short films 

Phantom (1998)
99 (2000)

Documentaries 

Düsseldorf (1991)

Web films 

Die MTV - OMA (2001)
Die Klitschkos (2011)
Kaufhaus Des Irrsinns (2012)
Harald & Franz (2014)
Bosch (2015)

Music videos 

"Dame" - Emile Wandelmer (1990)
"Candy Oh" - Bond (1992)
"Où trouver les violins" - Art Mengo (1992)
"Baby Blues" - Eddy Mitchell (1992)
"Cocaine" - Soul Patrol (1992)
"Not Gonna Change" - Swing Out Sister (1992)
"Coming On Strong" - The Shamen (1993)
"Blood Makes Noise" - Suzanne Vega (1993)
"99.9 Fahrenheit" - Suzanne Vega (1993)
"Nowhere" - Therapy? (1994)
"Run to the Sun" - Erasure (1994)
"Snail Shell" - They Might Be Giants (1994)
"Destination Echnaton" - The Shamen (1995)
"This Is Music" - The Verve (1995)
"Leavin'" - Tony Toni Tone (1995)
"Evangeline" - The Cocteau Twins (1995)

"Love Religion" - U96 (1995)
"Chain Reaction" - Hurricane N°1 (1995)
"Fire" - Die Krupps (1996)
"Ease Your Mind" - Galliano (1996)
"Mind Machine" - Deine Lakaien (1996)
"Away" - Deine Lakaien (1997)
"Echo On My Mind" - Earthling (1997)
"Fly" - Aaron Flower (1997)
"Crazy" - Düsenjäger (1998)
"Flamboyant" - Pet Shop Boys (2004)
"36 Grad" - Zweiraumwohnung (2011)
"Out the Blue" - Sub Focus ft Alice Gold

Advertisements 

DIESEL - Motor Gang
FORBES MAGAZINE - Party
GAPSTAR - Cadillac
VITOS - Le Pull
ALPIA - Schokoladenmeister - Campaign of 12 films
FISKARS - Scissor
CLORETTES - Gum
DER SPIEGEL - the wall
KARLSBERG PILSENER - the messenger
RADIO NRJ - party
PANASONIC - Videorecorder des Jahres
TUI - Tochter
APOLLINARIS - Campaign of 4 films
FREUNDIN - Campaign of 4 Films
JUNGHANS - Airport
MERCEDES - Colours
MERCEDES - Kilometer
OTTO VERSAND - Red Dress
SCHIESSER - Rowing
SPARKASSE - Girl
SWATCH - Campaign of 10 films
SWISS AIR  - Business Class
COLGATE - Bathroom
FROSTA - Campaign of 3 films
HOLLYWOOD CHEWING GUM - Campaign of 3 films
NECTA - Pineapple
NTV - Fernsehen macht dumm - Campaign of 4 films
BUNTE - Claudia Schiffer
LANGNESE - Blizz
AUDI - the Trip
RENAULT - Megane
FRANKFURTER ALLGEMEINE ZEITUNG - Dahinter steckt immer ein kluger Kopf - Campaign of 3 films
DEUTSCHE TELEKOM - Skype
L OREAL - Expedition
NIKE - Michael Stich
SWR - Violence
SWR - Class Room
SWR - Father & Son
COCA COLA - Armpits
INFINITY - Campaign of 8 films
NIKE - Young heroes
K-SWISS - The Vibe
LEXUS - Ralley
MAZDA - Zoom Zoom - Campaign of 10 films
MERCEDES - Production Line
GERMAN RED CROSS - Coins
LUCKY STRIKE - Coin
FISHERMANS FRIEND - Trip
NISSAN - Stagea - Campaign of 7 films
CADILLAC - Sprinkler
CANNON - Printer - Campaign of 3 films
GM - Winter Drive
GMC - Truck of the year - Campaign of 3 films
THRIFTY - the works - Campaign of 2 films
DEUTSCHE POST - The Breaks
ONE - Engine
ASAHI - Rush
BMW - Digits
FORD - F 150  - Campaign of 7 films
DEUTSCHE BANK - Shopping
BP - Journey
SUZUKI - Campaign of 5 films
Hyundai - Excellence

SIEMENS - Black & White
BUICK - Campaign of 3 films
CHEVROLET - record player
PENZOIL - dragster
QUAKER STATE - Race
AUTOTRADER - the mix
BMW - X5 - Campaign of 4 films
LAND ROVER - New Land
SNICKERS - The Giant
H&M - Berlin
MASERATI - Grand Tourismo
POKERSTARS - Boris Becker
PUMA - sleep
VOLKSWAGEN - Scirocco
SONY - Lola
HORNBACH - Hymne
MERCEDES - Tinker
Chevrolet - Chevy runs deep - Campaign of 4 films
JEEP - New York
McFIT - die Klitschkos
ADIDAS - Bayern
NATO - Campaign of 3 films
DEUTSCHE TELEKOM - Football
MEDIA MARKT - Kaufhaus des Irrsinns
RED BULL - X Fighters
SKY - Karl Lagerfeld - Campaign of 3 films
CARITAS - Fliegen
CARITAS - Progress
CARITAS - Neighbours
BUNDESLIGA - racism
NIKON - London 2012 ( Olympic Games )
OSRAM / SYLVANIA - Campaign of 3 films
QBE - rocket
SMART - Beep Beep
SPARKASSE - Mütter
POSTBANK - Pigs
SKY - Champions League
TOYOTA - Vellfire
TOYOTA - Prius
ADIDAS - Alaba
ASAHI - Super Dry
AUSTRIAN AIRLINES - Campaign of 3 films
McDONALD'S - Easy Morning
AXE - Mature
WÜRTH - Market
O2 - Campaign of 8 films
MCDONALD'S - 60 Years
RWE - Germany
SCHWEIZ TOURISMUS - 150 Years
SKODA - Line up
WEB.DE - E Mail
AMG - One man - one engine
BOSCH - the plug
JÄGERMEISTER - Campaign of 3 films
MERCEDES BENZ - C Class - Campaign of 3 films
AUDI - Q
BMW GROUP - The next 100 years
GOODYEAR - Juventus Turin
ADIDAS - Bayern München
HORNBACH - Heldenkranz
RENAULT - Megane II
MIGROS BANK - Slow motion
SUZUKI - Ignis

Television 

RTL RAGAZZI (1993)
GOTTSCHALK AMERICA, 10 Episodes (2003 / 2004)
SALUT HELMUT, pilot (2007)

Awards
2017 : GERMAN ART DIRECTORS CLUB ADC. Bronze for film "Heldenkranz" (category: TV)
2017 : CICLOPE INTERNATIONAL FESTIVAL OF CRAFT. Winner for film "Heldenkranz" (category: Writing)
2017 : ANNUAL MULTI MEDIA AWARDS. Gold for film "Heldenkranz" (category: TV / Film) 
2017 : SPOTLIGHT AWARD. Silver for film "Heldenkranz" (category: Digital Campaign)
2017 : DIE KLAPPE. Bronze for film "Heldenkranz" (category: TV) 
2017 : AME Awards. Gold for film "Heldenkranz" (category: media film) 
2017 : AME Awards. Silver for film "Heldenkranz" (category: social media) 
2017 : EURO BEST. Finalist for film "Heldenkranz" (category: Integrated)
2017 : JAHRBUCH DER WERBUNG. Bronze for film "Heldenkranz" (category: Integrated)
2016 : London International Awards. Bronze for film "Heldenkranz" (category: Verbal Identity) 
2015 : RED DOT AWARD. Winner for film "I’m loving’ it 2.0" (category: Sound Design)
2015 : GERMAN ART DIRECTORS CLUB ADC. Finalist for film "I’m loving’ it 2.0" (category: Music / Sound)
2015 : London International Awards. Bronze for film "I’m loving’ it 2.0" (category: Sound)
2015 : GERMAN ADVERTISING FESTIVAL. Winner for film "Global Neighbors" (category: Art Direction)
2015 : Cresta International Advertising Awards. Winner for film "Progress" (category: Craft : Special Effects)
2014 : CICLOPE INTERNATIONAL FESTIVAL OF CRAFT. Gold for film "Global Neighbors" (category: Production Design)
2014 : Clio Awards. Finalist for film "Global Neighbours" (category: TV / Cinema) 
2014 : Canadian Conference of the Arts. Gold for film "Easy Morning" (category: TV) 
2013 : MOBIUS AWARD CALIFORNIA. Winner for film "easy morning" (category: TV)
2012 : GERMAN ART DIRECTORS CLUB ADC. Finalist for film "Kaufhaus des Irrsinns" (category: TV / Cinema)
2012 : AME Awards. Finalist for film "never give up" (category: Film Direction) 
2012 : Cannes Lions International Festival of Creativity. Finalist for film "Progress" (category: Cinematography)
2012 : Cannes Lions International Festival of Creativity. Finalist for film "Progress" (category: Sound Design)
2012 : NEW YORK FESTIVALS. Finalist for film "never give up" (category: on line Films)
2012 : Communicator Awards. Gold Award of Excellence for film "Avoid Crash" (category: TV)
2012 : Communicator Awards. Silver for film "Safety Hazards" (category: TV / Cinema)
2012 : Communicator Awards. Silver for film "Safety Proofing" (category: TV / Cinema)
2012 : Communicator Awards. Silver for film "Dashboard Lights" (category: TV / Cinema)
2012 : TELLY AWARDS. Silver for film "Safety Hazards" (category: Automotive)
2012 : TELLY AWARDS. Silver for film "Safety Proofing" (category: Automotive)
2012 : TELLY AWARDS. Bronze for film "Dashboard Lights" (category: Automotive)
2012 : TELLY AWARDS. Bronze for film "Avoid Crash" (category: Automotive)
2012 : RED DOT AWARD. Grand Prix for film "Progress" (category: TV / Cinema)
2011 : GERMAN ART DIRECTORS CLUB ADC. Bronze for film "never give up" (category: Internet Films)
2011 : GERMAN ART DIRECTORS CLUB ADC. Finalist for film "never give up" (category: Casting)
2011 : DIE KLAPPE. Bronze for film "never give up" (category: online Film)
2010 : GERMAN ART DIRECTORS CLUB ADC. Silver for film "Hymne" (category: TV / Cinema ) 
2010 : GERMAN ART DIRECTORS CLUB ADC. Silver for film "Hymne" (category: Craft / Director) 
2010 : London International Awards. Silver for film "Hymne" (category: Direction)
2010 : London International Awards. Silver for film "Hymne" (category: Cinematography)
2010 : SPOTLIGHT AWARD. Gold for film "Hymne" (category: TV / Cinema) 
2010 : DIE KLAPPE. Gold for film "Hymne" (category: Best Direction) 
2010 : DIE KLAPPE. Gold for film "Hymne" (category: Best Commercial) 
2010 : DIE KLAPPE. Silver for film "Hymne" (category: Best Script)
2010 : DIE KLAPPE. Bronze for film "Hymne" (category: Cinematography)
2010 : EPICA AWARD. Gold for film "Hymne" (category: Household Maintenance) 
2003 : AD SPOT AWARD. Gold for film "the great Dictator" (category: non profit)
2001 : Clio Awards. Bronze for film "Rally" (category: Cinematography)
2000 : INTERNATIONAL AUTOMOTIVE ADVERTISING AWARDS. Certificate of Excellence for film "Wake, Balance, Clouds QX 4  ( three films )" (category: Sports Utility)
2000 : INTERNATIONAL AUTOMOTIVE ADVERTISING AWARDS. Certificate of Excellence for film "Lightning, Treeshade I30 ( two films )" (category: Passenger Cars)
2000 : THE 2000 AURORA AWARDS. Gold Award for film "Wires" (category: Corporate Image / Promotion)
2000 : THE 2000 AURORA AWARDS. Gold Award for film "Infiniti Campaign 1" (category: Advertising Campaign)
2000 : THE 2000 AURORA AWARDS. Gold Award for film "Infiniti Campaign 2" (category: Advertising Campaign)
2000 : THE 2000 AURORA AWARDS. Gold Award for film "Infiniti Campaign 3" (category: Advertising Campaign)
2000 : THE NEW YORK FESTIVALS. Finalist for film "Real Life" (category: Cinema Commercial)
1999 : Cannes Lions International Festival of Creativity. Gold Lion for film "Father and Son" (category: Public Service) 
1997 : Cannes Lions International Festival of Creativity. Finalist for film "Classroom" (category: Public Service)
1997 : NEW YORK FESTIVALS. Gold for film "Dahinter steckt immer ein kluger Kopf" (category: TV / Cinema)
1997 : DIE KLAPPE. Gold for film "Scheiss Kinder" (category: TV / Cinema)
1996 : Cannes Lions International Festival of Creativity. Silver Lion for film "Terminator" (category: Public Service)
1996 : DIE KLAPPE. Silver for film "Father and Son" (category: TV / Cinema)
1994 : Cannes Lions International Festival of Creativity. Finalist for film "Mädchen" (category: TV)
1994 : GERMAN ART DIRECTORS CLUB ADC. Silver for film "Numbers" (category: TV)
1993 : GERMAN ART DIRECTORS CLUB ADC. Silver for film "Television" (category: TV / Campaign)
1993 : GERMAN ART DIRECTORS CLUB ADC. Silver for film "Diet" (category: TV / Campaign)
1993 : GERMAN ART DIRECTORS CLUB ADC. Silver for film "Mercedes Sondermodelle" (category: TV / Cinema)
1992 : GERMAN ART DIRECTORS CLUB ADC. Silver for film "Videorecorder des Jahres" (category: TV)
1992 : GERMAN ART DIRECTORS CLUB ADC. Bronze for film "Mach sein" (category: TV / Cinema)
1992 : GERMAN ART DIRECTORS CLUB ADC. Silver for film "Red Triangle" (category: TV / Cinema)
1992 : GERMAN ART DIRECTORS CLUB ADC. Silver for film "Schokoladenmeister" (category: TV)

References

External links

1964 births
Living people
German documentary film directors
German music video directors
Advertising directors
Mass media people from Lower Saxony
People from Wilhelmshaven